The New Naturalist Library (also known as The New Naturalists) is a series of books published by Collins in the United Kingdom, on a variety of natural history topics relevant to the British Isles. The aim of the series at the start was: "To interest the general reader in the wild life of Britain by recapturing the inquiring spirit of the old naturalists." An editors' preface to a 1952 monograph says: "An object of the New Naturalist series is the recognition of the many-sidedness of British natural history, and the encouragement of unusual and original developments of its forgotten or neglected facets."

The first volume to appear was E.B. Ford's Butterflies in 1945. The authors of this series are usually eminent experts, often professional scientists. This gives the series authority, and many are or have been authoritative introductory textbooks on a subject for some years. The books are written in scientific style, but are intended to be readable by the non-specialist, and are an early example of popular science in the media.

The books of the series have had considerable influence on many students who later became professional biologists, such as W.D. Hamilton and Mike Majerus. The latter was inspired by Ford's Butterflies and Moths, and has since added two volumes of his own to the series.

A parallel series known as the New Naturalist Monograph Library (and often referred to as The New Naturalist Special Volumes) was also published. Its aim was to cover "in greater detail... a single species or group of species". There have been no additions to the Monograph Library since 1971.

Volume 82 of the main series, The New Naturalists, described the series to date, with authors' biographies and a guide to collecting the books.

The original editorial board consisted of Julian Huxley, James Fisher, Dudley Stamp, John Gilmour and Eric Hosking. Until 1985, the highly characteristic dust jacket illustrations were by Rosemary and Clifford Ellis; since then they have been by Robert Gillmor.

Being a numbered series, with a very low print run for some volumes, the books are highly collectable. Second-hand copies of the rarer volumes, in good condition, can command high prices. The 100th volume, Woodlands by Oliver Rackham was published in 2006. Woodlands (volume 100) was also published in 2006 as a "leatherbound" edition, limited to 100 copies. In fact it was  fake leather. The second "leatherbound" New Naturalist - Dragonflies by Philip Corbet and Stephen Brooks - was published in 2008. The (fake) leather edition of Dragonflies (volume 106) was initially limited to 400 copies, which was subsequently limited to 303, and finally to 250. According to the New Naturalist website only 217 were actually sold and the remaining unsold stock is being kept secure at HarperCollins's offices.  HarperCollins continue to produce limited numbers of "leatherbound" editions of all volumes published since Dragonflies, but only from Islands (volume 109) was real leather actually used. All recent volumes have only 50 leatherbound copies.

The series won the 2007 British Book Design and Production Award for "brand or series identity", and in 2008 the official website was launched, with features including the latest news, a members only area with access to exclusive content and downloads, and a forum.

In around 1990, Bloomsbury produced a series of facsimile editions, as hardbacks with new dustjacket designs, and with all plates in black and white, including those which were originally in colour.

Main series

Monographs

See also 
:Category:New Naturalist writers

Notes and references

External links 
Official website for the series
List of monographs with jacket illustrations

Conservation in the United Kingdom
Natural history books
Series of non-fiction books
Lists of books by imprint or publisher